Irupatham Noottandu is a 1987 Indian Malayalam-language gangster film directed by K. Madhu, written by S. N. Swamy and produced by M. Mani. It stars Mohanlal, Suresh Gopi, and Ambika. The film's music was composed by Shyam. The plot follows Sagar Alias Jacky, a maverick youth who runs a gold smuggling racket for Sekharankutty, the son of the Chief Minister of Kerala. Their relationship stains after the latter brings narcotics into the business.

Irupatham Noottandu was released on 14 May 1987 enjoys a cult following in Malayalam cinema. It was remade in Kannada as Jackey (1989) and in Telugu as 20va Sathabdam (1990) with Suman and Ambareesh reprising Mohanlal's role in the Kannada and Telugu versions, while Devaraj portrayed Suresh Gopi's role in both versions. The film also has a spiritual sequel titled Sagar Alias Jacky Reloaded, which is released in 2009 and directed by Amal Neerad with Mohanlal reprising his role.

Plot 
Sagar Alias Jacky is a maverick youth, who turned to gold smuggling due to financial situation and inspiration from the media glorifying the Mumbai underworld and its gangsters. He is partnered with Shekharankutty, who is the son of the ruling CM Inchakadu Ramakrishna Pillai. The Custom officers are provided with an information about one of the cars among the rally race cars : A blue Maruti car is being used in gold smuggling. Suddenly, the car sways from the pack where Jacky and his aide Lawrence hide the gold in the car's spare wheel and pass the customs checking and reach Shekharankutty's house. Jacky, Shekkarankutty and their aides: Qasim, Tony and Chanakya relaxes in a room at Chanakya's hotel. 

Qasim and Tony are about to smuggle gold tonight. Shekarankutty warns Qasim that there is a traitor among them. Unfortunately, Qasim turns out to be the traitor, who escapes with the gold after killing Tony. He is then caught by Jacky and is drowned to death. The next day, Qasim's body is recovered by the police and Chanakya is sent to investigate, where he meets Ashwathy, who is a reporter for a news magazine investigating the connection between politics and crime in Kerala. At the scene, she meets Jeevan, the current investigating officer whom she studied with. Jacky visits Kayikka, a fellow smuggler and reveals that they killed Qasim. Kayikka reveals that his eldest son Shahul has turned to selling weed. 

Jacky turns him away for the better where he sees his love interest Jyothi's mother, who is actually in prison for murder. Ashwathy is drawn to Jacky's life and tries to get his attention by releasing an article stating that the CM is connected with Jacky. With his influence, Sekkarankutty bails others and learns that Jacky had informed the police. Pillai demolishes Jyothi's place, but Jacky threatens him and demands to build those houses. Shekarankutty is enraged where he kills Lawrence and hits the car which had Jacky and his mother, where Jacky's mother dies and Pillai asks Shekharankutty to leave for Dubai with full police protection, but Jacky finds a way to sneak into the airport disguised as a pilot where he chases Shekharankutty and kills him. Jacky gets arrested and is jailed on the day of Jyoti's release.

Cast

Mohanlal as Sagar alias "Jacky"
Suresh Gopi as Shekharankutty
Ambika as Aswathy Varma
Santhosh as Lawrence
Prathapachandran as CM Inchakadu Ramakrishna Pillai
Urvashi as Jyothi
Jagathy Sreekumar as Ashokan / Chanakyan
Sreenath as Jeevan IPS
Janardhanan as IG Thomas IPS
Kaviyoor Ponnamma as Meenakshiyamma
Sukumari as Janakiyamma, Jyothi's mother
Adoor Bhasi as Varma
T. P. Madhavan as CI Pothen
K. P. A. C. Sunny as Koshy
Jagadish as Balakrishnan
Mamukkoya as Koya
Jagannatha Varma as Pillai, Opposition leader
Jose as Santhosh, Customs officer
Vishnuprakash as George
Kollam Ajith as Kasim
Jayan as Tony

Production
Writer S. N. Swamy got the idea for the film from a photograph featured in an English-language Sunday magazine published from Calcutta. Swami recalled in an interview that it was the time when mafia bosses had a glorified image in the country after the national emergency period in India (1975–1977). That was the time when public began to learn about Bombay-based mafia leaders such as Haji Mastan, Yusuf Patel, Varadarajan Mudaliar among others. The magazine had an article on Mastan and a photograph featuring much respected actor Dilip Kumar and his wife Saira Banu touching Mastan's feet for giving pranāma. It was shocking for Swami, he never imagined a mafia leader would be respected as such. It inspired the plot for Irupatham Noottandu and the character Sagar Alias Jacky. The lengthy climax of the film was shot in a single day. Vipindas was the cinematographer.

Soundtrack
The music was composed by Shyam and the lyrics were written by Chunakkara Ramankutty.

Box office
The film was released on 14 May 1987 and was super hit in box office.

Sequel 

A spiritual successor sequel titled Sagar Alias Jacky directed by Amal Neerad was released on 26 March 2009.

References

External links 
 

1980s Malayalam-language films
Indian gangster films
Indian crime thriller films
Films about organised crime in India
Films about the illegal drug trade
Cultural depictions of the Mafia
Films directed by K. Madhu
%Jacky1
Malayalam films remade in other languages
1980s crime thriller films
Films shot in Thiruvananthapuram
Films about the Narcotics Control Bureau